The prime minister's official spokesperson or alternatively prime minister's official spokesman/spokeswoman is a position in the United Kingdom's Civil Service, located in the Prime Minister's Office in 10 Downing Street and used by the British prime minister to convey information to the public. The prime minister's official spokesperson usually addresses a small group of press and media correspondents, known as lobby correspondents, each morning to deliver statements on current events on behalf of the prime minister.

James Slack was appointed as the prime minister's official spokesperson on 10 February 2017. He remained in the post after Boris Johnson took over the government on 24 July 2019. In December 2020 it was announced that at the beginning of 2021 Slack would succeed Lee Cain as the Downing Street director of communications, it was subsequently announced on 9 February 2021 that Max Blain had been appointed as the prime minister's official spokesperson and would start in the post in April 2021.

List of prime minister's spokespeople

References

External links 
 
 Prime Minister's Office: press briefings

British Prime Minister's Office